Yixueyuan is a station on Line 2 of the Shenyang Metro. The station opened on 30 December 2013.

Station Layout

References 

Railway stations in China opened in 2013
Shenyang Metro stations